The Rhapsody Tour was a worldwide concert tour by Queen + Adam Lambert, the collaboration between British rock band Queen and American singer Adam Lambert. The tour was announced following the success of the biopic film Bohemian Rhapsody. The tour marks the group's third visits to North America and Oceania after performing there in 2014 as part of the Queen + Adam Lambert Tour 2014–2015 and in 2017 and 2018 as part of the Queen + Adam Lambert Tour 2017–2018.
The North American dates of the tour sold out in April 2019. The North American leg began on 10 July 2019, in Vancouver, Canada at the Rogers Arena and continued throughout the continent until its last show at the Spectrum Center in Charlotte on 23 August 2019.

Background
After performing with American Idol finalists Kris Allen and Adam Lambert during the programme's season finale in 2009, the active members of Queen, Brian May and Roger Taylor, began contemplating the future of the band after the group's amicable split with touring collaborator Paul Rodgers. Two years later, at the 2011 MTV Europe Music Awards, Queen was presented that year's Global Icon Award, accepted by May. As part of the broadcast, Queen performed a short set with Lambert, receiving an overwhelmingly welcoming response. Speculation regarding a collaboration with Lambert soon arose, with the three formally announcing a short summer tour of Europe in 2012, including three dates at the Hammersmith Apollo in London, as well as shows in Ukraine, Russia and Poland. As with the partnership with Paul Rodgers, John Deacon chose not to participate.

Setlists

Tour dates

Grossing

2019: $45.5 million from 25 shows
2020: $67.5 million from 16 shows

Total available grossing: $156.7 million from 63 shows.

Tour band

Brian May – electric and acoustic guitars, vocals 
Roger Taylor – drums, vocals
Adam Lambert – lead vocals 
Freddie Mercury – vocals and piano (pre-recorded)
John Deacon - bass guitars (pre-recorded)

Additional musicians: 
Spike Edney – keyboards, vocals
Neil Fairclough – bass guitars, vocals
Tyler Warren – percussion, additional drums, vocals

Notes

References

External links
QueenOnline – Queen's official website
Adam Lambert – Adam Lambert's official website

2019 concert tours
2020 concert tours
2022 concert tours
Concert tours postponed due to the COVID-19 pandemic
Queen + Adam Lambert concert tours